Hot Barbeque is an album by organist Jack McDuff recorded in 1965 and released on the Prestige label.

Reception
Allmusic awarded the album 3½ stars stating "McDuff had an excellent quartet for this mid-1960s soul-jazz outing... Nothing remarkable, just very enjoyable, high-spirited genre music".

Track listing 
All compositions by Jack McDuff except as indicated
 "Hot Barbeque" - 3:01  
 "The Party's Over" (Betty Comden, Adolph Green, Jule Styne) - 6:53  
 "Briar Patch" - 2:55  
 "Hippy Dip" - 6:30  
 "601½ North Poplar" - 4:17  
 "Cry Me a River" (Arthur Hamilton) - 4:50  
 "The Three Day Thang" - 3:37

Personnel 
Jack McDuff - organ
Red Holloway - tenor saxophone
George Benson - guitar
Joe Dukes - drums

References 

 

Jack McDuff albums
1966 albums
Prestige Records albums